The athletics events of the final stage of the 6th Summer Spartakiad of the Peoples of the USSR were held in the Central Lenin (Luzhniki) Stadium in Moscow between 27 July and 30 July 1979. Competition was won by Moscow, followed by Ukrainian SSR, and Russian SFSR. Two new Soviet records were made: Vladimir Kischkun won pole vault with a 5.45, breaking previous record by 4 cm, and Natalya Lebedeva won 100 metres hurdles with a new Soviet record of 12,8, cutting previous record by 0,2 seconds.

Decathlon and pentathlon competitions took place in Tallinn, from 7 to 9 June.

Men's events

Women's events

References

Лёгкая атлетика. Справочник / Составитель Р. В. Орлов. — М.: «Физкультура и спорт», 1983. — 392 с.
Панорама спортивного года. 1975 / Составитель А. Н. Корольков. — М.: Физкультура и спорт, 1976. — С. 31—35.

1975
Soviet Spartakiad
Spartakiad
1975
1975 Spartakiad